Sabado Barkada (English: Saturday Troop) was a musical variety show in the Philippines that aired every Saturday before Game KNB? over ABS-CBN TV-4 Bacolod. It also aired in neighboring cities such as Iloilo and the whole of Western Visayas. The show took its inspiration from talent search and discovery program formats, giving the floor to aspiring, talented Ilonggo youngsters who acted as guest hosts and performers. On its noted segment "Matilaw Ka: Reloaded" ("Will you try?: Reloaded"), contestants attempted a certain task, with the winner earning a cash prize and the others taking home consolation prizes. Their music segment, "Top picks of the week", coordinated with MOR 101.5 (My Only Radio For Life! Bacolod) to feature the week's three most requested songs. Local bands also brought live music to the studio every week.

History
The show was created on February 15, 2003, as a replacement for "S na S: Sinadya na, Star pa!"/"Barkadahan sa S na S", which was already crippled following the departure of its main host John Arceo to GMA Iloilo. Only Tonipet Yulo was retained from the previous show while Rene Jun "Totoy Balotoy" Ogapong was promoted to direct it. New talents like Mel Yanson, James Moya and RJ Chua were introduced to the public as the new core group of the show. "Sabado Barkada" also started a practice where the most beautiful and handsome teens of Bacolod were given hosting slots in the show, giving it a "sosyal" feel.

The show went well in its initial telecasts, but Yulo left the show in 2004 after he suffered a stroke that left him half-paralyzed, and Moya left before being replaced by two DJs from MOR 101.5: Rex Luther and James King. The show's ratings suffered after rival show Bongga! of GMA Iloilo gained headway and conquered viewership in the whole of Western Visayas.  No way to go but up, "Sabado" decided to go "masa" too by re-introducing "S na S"'s previous segment "Matilaw Ka" (Will You Try?) as their answer to "Bongga!"'s famous gay boxing portion "Pok Gi Pok".

Reformat and comeback
In 2006, "Sabado Barkada" reformatted in response to its declining ratings and the outstanding performance of its competitor.  It added new faces to its roster of hosts now led by Mel Yanson and James King, and did away with the usual inclusion of Bacolod teens to co-host after negative feedback from televiewers. To show that viewers had a say on the show's content, it added the slogan "Bida Ka" ("You Lead"), with an alternative rock theme that on the show's OBB.

The show went out from its weekly broadcast from the ABS-CBN studio in Bacolod and held shows in out-of-town locations. Some Kapamilya stars from ABS-CBN Manila joined the cast in those shows. With the public slowly taking notice of the show's renewed vigor following the reformat, the show was able to gain headway in Bacolod ratings and also kept loyal viewers who watched abroad through TFC (The Filipino Channel). In August, the show finally surpassed "Bongga!" in the Iloilo ratings and gained more momentum after the latter show signed off.

Decommission
On October 20, 2007, "Sabado Barkada" signed off as it gave way to "Kapamilya Winner Ka! (now Kapamilya, Mas Winner Ka!)", a multi-regional game show qualifier for ABS-CBN's "Pilipinas, Game Ka Na Ba?" which first premiered the 27th of the same month. Contestants can win P5,000 to P10,000 in the show's bingo format. Its current host is PBB Season Two finalist Nel Rapiz.

Final hosts
 Dorothy joy Luarca
 James King
 RJ Chua
 Mel Yanson
 Rexylyn Cabaltera
 Aerian Julian
 Channel Dimayuga
 Rex Luther
 Angelique Robles
 Jaypeesy Dajay
 Andrew Gellagani

Former hosts
 Tonipet Yulo
 James Moya
 Kate Sansing
 Althea Mauricio
 Jason East
 Andrea Molina
 Raven Ice Mirza
 Michelle Duyungan
 Melanie Ca-ayon
 Ziggy Rubiato
 Nixie Garcia
 Geej Ascalon
 Candy Flores
 George Michael Bautista
 Xen Antenor
 April Gustillo
 Nesha Faith Dianala
 John Yroll Espuerta
 Mark Kenneth Espuerta
 Jumaril Buenaventura
 Chris Alvin Chiong
 Giban Panoy
 Rhoel Alisbo
 Paul Nathan Delubio
 Jessa Ballares
 Boy Cuadra
 Allan Atienza
 Jose Chua III
 Yep Yep Yanson
 Queenie Ira Mae Delima
 Holly Rossel Penaflor
 Greg Calidguid Jr
 Bianca Margarette Bait-it

See also
Kapamilya, Mas Winner Ka! (2007-2018; ABS-CBN Bacolod)
KSP:Kapamilya Sabado Party (2005-2007; ABS-CBN Davao)
ABS-CBN Regional Network Group
Game Ka Na Ba?

2003 Philippine television series debuts
2007 Philippine television series endings
Philippine variety television shows
ABS-CBN Regional shows